Eek-A-Nomics is the ninth studio album by Jamaican reggae artist Eek-A-Mouse.

Track listing

Personnel
Vocals –  Eek-A-Mouse, Noel Alphonso, Paul Henton
Bass –  Paul Henton
Drums –  Noel Alphonso
Guitar –  Ronald Butler
Piano –  Paul Henton

1988 albums